Kingdom of Madness is the debut studio album by the English rock band Magnum. It was recorded in 1976, and was released in 1978 by Jet Records. Kingdom of Madness was awarded a 4 star review in Sounds, with writer Geoff Barton suggesting the band were capable of making a strong claim for a slice of the market occupied by the likes of Styx, Kansas and Yes.

The album was described as "flute-laced progressive rock sound similar to that of Jethro Tull. The songwriting ranges from imaginative, mythical tales on "In the Beginning" and the title song, to deeply philosophical tracks like "Universe" and "All That Is Real"." The album was also noted for its imaginative lyrics, with influence from Hawkwind member, Blue Öyster Cult lyricist and science fiction author Michael Moorcock, the songs "Lord of Chaos" and "Stormbringer" directly referencing Moorcock's Elric series.

Prior to the release, Magnum had toured the UK extensively with the likes of Judas Priest and had built upon a solid fanbase. Many of the songs had been played in Magnum's live set since 1976, and were suitably "road tested". Many fans were familiar with the material before the album was released, this helped the album debut at a respectable No. 58 in the UK charts. Because of the delayed release the tracks "Master of Disguise", "Without Your Love", "Find the Time" and "Everybody Needs" originally intended for the album, were dropped for more up-to-date songs, such as opening track "In the Beginning". These tracks were later included on Sanctuary Records 2005 2CD Remastered and Expanded edition of the album. Two singles were released to promote the album, "Kingdom of Madness" in July 1978 and "Invasion" in September 1978, although Magnum's debut single for CBS, "Sweets for My Sweet" released in February 1975 was not included on the album. The 2005 expanded version of the album was reissued on 22 September 2006 in Japan with Mini LP/Paper Sleeve packaging through Arcangelo. The album was also included in a limited edition Japanese Box Set, comprising all six of Sanctuary Records Expanded and Remastered releases with Mini LP/Paper Sleeve packaging. The set included an outer box featuring Magnum's Chase the Dragon artwork.

Track listing

1 – 4 Demo recorded at Nest Studios, Birmingham, 1974.
5 – 6 taken from Magnum's rare first single Sweets for My Sweet in 1975.
7 – 10 Outtakes from the Kingdom of Madness sessions in 1976 at De Lane Lea Studios.
11 Alternate recording, recorded at Battle Studios, Hastings in 1979.
1 – 4; 7 – 11 originally appeared on Magnum's 1993 compilations Archive.

Reissues

Bonus tracks
Sanctuary Records released a 2005 Remastered and Expanded edition with a Bonus Disc.

"Sea Bird," "Slipping Away," "Stormbringer" and "Captain America" (Disc 2, 1 – 4)
These four tracks where the first ever recordings of Magnum and were recorded at one or Birmingham's foremost studios "Nest" in 1974. A time whilst Magnum initially searched for a musical identity. — Tony Clarkin

These tracks originally appeared on Magnum's 1993 compilation Archive.

"Sweets for My Sweet" and "Movin' On" (Disc 2, 5 – 6)
These tracks were taken from Magnum's rare first single in 1975 – a cover of The Searcher's "Sweets for My Sweet". "Movin' On" was Tony Clarkin's and Magnum's first original song.

"Master of Disguise," "Without Your Love," "Find the Time" and "Everybody Needs" (Disc 2, 7 – 10)
These four tracks were recorded during the Kingdom of Madness sessions in 1976 at De Lane Lea Studios but never made the album. A different version of "Everybody Needs" was originally released as the B-Side of the "Changes" single. — Tony Clarkin

These tracks originally appeared on Magnum's 1993 compilation Archive.

"Kingdom of Madness"  (Disc 2, 11)
We didn't actually think there could be another version of this track not already released but, here it is. Recorded at Battle Studios, Hastings in 1979. — Tony Clarkin

These tracks originally appeared on Magnum's 1993 compilation Archive.

Singles
Sweets for My Sweet 7" (February 1975)
 "Sweets for My Sweet" [A-Side] (Doc Pomus and Mort Shuman) – 3:02
 "Movin' On" [B-Side] – 3:47

Kingdom of Madness 7" (July 1978)
"Kingdom of Madness" [Edit] – 0:00
"In the Beginning" [Edit] – 4:17

Invasion 7" (September 1978)
"Invasion" [LP Version] – 3:22
"Universe" [LP Version] – 3:45

Personnel
Bob Catley — Vocals
Tony Clarkin – Guitar
Wally Lowe – Bass
Richard Bailey – Keyboards, Flute
Kex Gorin – Drums
Dave Morgan – Bass, Vocals (on Disc 2, Tracks 1 – 6)

Production
Produced by Jake Commander
Recorded at De Lane Lea Studios
Engineered by Dick Plant, Barry Kidd, Dave Strickland
Mastered at De Lane Lea Studios by Kevin Metcalf

Related information
Kingdom of Madness is also the debut album of German power metal band Edguy, whose lead singer Tobias Sammet has collaborated with Magnum lead singer Bob Catley on his Avantasia project.

Kingdom of Madness is a UK band formed in 2018 by ex-Magnum keyboardist Mark Stanway featuring drummer Micky Barker, keyboardist and flautist Richard Bailey, Mo Birch (vocals and percussion), Laurence Archer on guitar, Brian Badhams on bass, vocalist Chris Ousey. The primarily toured performing songs from the 'Classic Magnum' era from 1976 to 1995.

References

External links
 www.magnumonline.co.uk — Official Magnum site
 Kingdom Of Madness: Expanded Edition — Sanctuary Records' mini site

Magnum (band) albums
1978 debut albums
Jet Records albums